Sandy Valley may refer to:
Sandy_Valley, Inyo_County, California an unincorporated community in Inyo County
Sandy Valley, Nevada, an unincorporated community in Clark County
Sandy Valley, Pennsylvania, an unincorporated community in Jefferson County